Oscar Fitzallen Moore (January 27, 1817 – June 24, 1885) was a U.S. Representative from Ohio.

Born in Lagrange, Ohio, Moore attended the public schools and Wellsburg Academy, and was graduated from Washington (now Washington & Jefferson College, Washington, Pennsylvania, in 1836.
He studied law.
He was admitted to the bar in 1838 and commenced practice in Portsmouth, Ohio, in 1839.
He served as member of the state house of representatives in 1850 and 1851.
He served as member of the state senate in 1852 and 1853.

Moore was elected as an Opposition Party candidate to the Thirty-fourth Congress (March 4, 1855 – March 3, 1857).
He was an unsuccessful candidate for reelection in 1856 to the Thirty-fifth Congress.
He served as lieutenant colonel and later as colonel of the Thirty-third Regiment, Ohio Volunteer Infantry, during the Civil War.
He resumed the practice of his profession in Portsmouth, Ohio.
He died at Waverly, Ohio, June 24, 1885.
He was interred in Greenlawn Cemetery, Portsmouth, Ohio.

Sources

1817 births
1885 deaths
People from LaGrange, Ohio
Opposition Party members of the United States House of Representatives from Ohio
Members of the Ohio House of Representatives
Ohio state senators
People from Portsmouth, Ohio
Union Army colonels
People of Ohio in the American Civil War
Ohio lawyers
Washington & Jefferson College alumni
19th-century American politicians
19th-century American lawyers